Hydropneumatic devices such as hydropneumatic accumulators or pulsation dampeners are devices which prevent, but do not absorb, alleviate, arrest, attenuate, or suppress a shock that already exists, meaning that these devices prevent the creation of a shock wave at an otherwise earlier stage. These can include pulsation dampeners, hydropneumatic accumulators, water hammer preventers, water hammer arrestors, and other things.

Hydropneumatic water hammer preventers

Purpose 
To provide a chamber of sufficient volume to allow an extension of time in which a given flow may be accelerated or decelerated without sudden large change in pressure. See also expansion tank. When shock waves of an incompressible fluid within a piping system exist, especially at a high velocity, there is a high chance for water hammer. To help prevent a swing check from slamming and causing water hammer, a spring-assisted non-slam check valve is installed. Rather than relying on flow or gravity to be closed, the non-slam design prevents a sudden velocity decrease and reverse flow.

Characteristics 
The chamber is generally adapted to contain a separator member which prevents the escape of a pre-filled compressed inert gas.

Applications 
 Placed closely before a valve that is closed quickly. Stops water hammering.
 Placed immediately after the discharge of a pump that is started fast into a pipe full of a long column of liquid. Reduces start up surge pressure.
 Placed immediately after a pump, which when caused to stop suddenly, enables a vacuum to form, which pulls the flow back towards the pump. Prevents an implosion bang.

Variations 
 Having a separator membrane into the interior of which the liquid is communicated. Used for corrosive liquids, so that the chamber metal can be of low cost.
 Having a metal bellows separator membrane for use at low and higher temperatures than are compatible with an elastomeric or plastomeric membrane.
 Having a float separator to reduce the rate of gas absorption at the liquid interface, typically used in vessel chambers larger than 500 gallons.

Hydropneumatic pump controllers

Purpose 
 Means of control for multiple fixed delivery volume, low cost low complexity pumps; to provide variable flow as required by small (say  +/- 10 psi) pressure increase or decrease of a system.
 Means of control for pump unloading / recirculation against no pressure, without electric pressure switches.

Characteristics 
Pressure cylinders containing a movable separator member between a  gas and a liquid, said moveable member causing the actuation of directional control valve or valves.

Applications 
In a circuit after a pump that is followed by a valved-side branch, and beyond a check valve, so that this device can only discharge liquid volume by a pressure fall of the system.

Variations 
 Having a protruding drive rod, cams from which trip valve handles.
 Having magnetically actuated reed switched.
 Having infrared signaling of separator position.

Hydropneumatic pulsation filters

Purpose 
To provide means of reducing the amplitude of pressure changes the velocity of which is in the order of 1.4 km/s. All are used in industry.

Characteristics 
Pressure container with separate inlet and outlet, connectable to a pipe system so that all pressure changes must attempt to pass through said chamber. Entry and exit of  said chamber being of a diameter relative to chamber diameter that provides a high discharge coefficient, and without close proximity of any reflective surface. Lack of any sudden change in cross section area of  flow path that would reflect a pressure wave, i.e. no orifice plate(s).

Applications by frequency response 
For pulsation above frequency 100 Hz (i.e. for high speed pumps and all pipe systems shorter than say 80 yards): no moving parts devices.
For pulsation frequencies below 100 Hz: certain moving parts devices of known membrane response characteristics.

Variations 
Combination “dual purpose”  devices  addressing  “acceleration head reduction”  see 4. below by means of a gas containment plus characteristics 3.2 above.

Hydropneumatic acceleration head reducers

Purpose 
To minimize the mass of liquid that has to be accelerated when flow velocity changes. Within a piping system, pressure rises when a volume of fluid becomes present. This acceleration head needs to be reduced to prevent damage to pump components and excessive noise.

Characteristics
Mountable in any orientation such that the device is connectable directly to the suction check valve beneath the pump or directly to any vertical or horizontal discharge check valve; minimizing the length of any liquid column mass that will experience velocity change. Pump connection being separate from system connection so that no  acceleration head changes occur due to reciprocation within one port.

Applications 
a. Reduction in drive energy costs required by any pump.
b. Reduction in pipe diameter and schedule (wall thickness) costs of any pipe system.
c. Decrease in fatigue and increase in safety of all pressure piping systems.
d. Increase in accuracy and automatability of all pressure and flow control instruments.
e. Increase in rotating equipment life and MTBF.
f. Reduction in service down time.

Variations 
a. For chemicals and process pump systems: having PTFE membranes.
b. For sludges and slurries: having a clear unobstructed flow path direct from in to out.
c. For general purposes: having an elastomeric bladder separator.

Pulsation dampeners

Misuse of the term
Some manufacturers of pulsation dampeners provide items which do not dampen pulsations. The compressibility of a gas, often nitrogen because it is inert at normal temperatures, stores any sudden volume change. Storing sudden volume change enables volume to change against a soft gas cushion, without the need to accelerate all the existing liquid in the system out of the way of the new volume coming from a pump. Therefore, as all the volume in a system does not have to be suddenly accelerated, the cushion is preventing "acceleration head" (force) having to be generated. The pressure pulse is accordingly not generated in the first place, so it is not dampened at all. The gas cushion simply allows volume change to be stored. The manufacturers are providing, are liquid accumulators, not an item which removes energy.

Hydropneumatic accumulators 
Gas cushion (spring) pre-filled accumulators of liquids are called hydropneumatic accumulators. "Hydro" because a liquid (like water) is involved. "Pneumatic" because a gas (like air) is involved. "Accumulator" because the purpose is to store or accumulate liquid volume by easy compression of the gas. These devices are typified by having only one liquid connection that goes to a "T" on the system.

Non-hydropneumatic
There are other forms of accumulator used for fluid power hydraulic purposes. For example, coil spring plus sealed piston; though these are less popular. Therefore, a hydraulic accumulator is not necessarily a hydropneumatic accumulator.

References

Hydraulics